Food Paradise is a television series narrated by Jesse Blaze Snider (formerly by Mason Pettit) that features the best places to find various cuisines at food locations across America. Episodes were originally shown on the Travel Channel. Other networks began airing episodes of the series including the Cooking Channel in 2019 and Food Network in 2020.

Synopsis
Each episode focuses on a certain type of restaurant, such as "Diners", "Bars", "Drive-Thrus" or "Breakfast" places that people go to find a certain food specialty.

Episodes

Season 1 (2007–2008)

See main article: Food Paradise (season 1)

The first episode premiered on December 17, 2007 on Travel Channel. It’s entitled "Hamburger Paradise". There was a total of 15 episodes.

Season 2 (2010)

See main article: Food Paradise (season 2)

Season 3 (2011)

See main article: Food Paradise (season 3)

Season 4 (2012–2013)

See main article: Food Paradise (season 4)

Season 5 (2014)

See main article: Food Paradise (season 5)

Season 6 (2015)

See main article: Food Paradise (season 6)

Season 7 (2015)

See main article: Food Paradise (season 7)

Season 8 (2016)

See main article: Food Paradise (season 8)

Season 9 (2016–2017)

See main article: Food Paradise (season 9)

Season 10 (2017)

See main article: Food Paradise (season 10)

Season 11 (2017)

See main article: Food Paradise (season 11)

Season 12 (2017–2018)

See main article: Food Paradise (season 12)

Season 13 (2017–2018)

See main article: Food Paradise (season 13)

Season 14 (2017–2018)

See main article: Food Paradise (season 14)

Season 15 (2018)

See main article: Food Paradise (season 15)

Season 16 (2018)

See main article: Food Paradise (season 16)

Season 17 (2018)

See main article: Food Paradise (season 17)

Season 18 (2018)

See main article: Food Paradise (season 18)

Season 19 (2019–2021)

See main article: Food Paradise (season 19)

Season 20 (2021)

See main article: Food Paradise (season 20)

Special Episodes

State Fair Foods Paradise (2012)

Food Paradise: London (2012)

Chinese Food Paradise (2013)

References

External links
Food Paradise @Travelchannel.com

Travel Channel original programming
American travel television series
Television shows set in New Braunfels, Texas
2008 American television series debuts